Vladimir Bortsov (born 1974) is a Kazakhstani cross-country skier. He competed at the Winter Olympics in 1998 in Nagano, and in 2002 in Salt Lake City.

References

1974 births
Living people
People from Pavlodar
Kazakhstani male cross-country skiers
Olympic cross-country skiers of Kazakhstan
Cross-country skiers at the 1998 Winter Olympics
Cross-country skiers at the 2002 Winter Olympics
Asian Games medalists in cross-country skiing
Cross-country skiers at the 1996 Asian Winter Games
Medalists at the 1996 Asian Winter Games
Asian Games gold medalists for Kazakhstan
Asian Games silver medalists for Kazakhstan
Asian Games bronze medalists for Kazakhstan
20th-century Kazakhstani people